The H-10 Pheasant was a tandem-seat conventional landing gear-equipped biplane with fabric covering, built in 1928 by the Pheasant Aircraft Company to compete in the crowded market of barnstorming biplanes. The company dissolved shortly after, during the Great Depression of the early 1930s.

Development
The H-10 was designed by Orville Hickman for Lee R. Biggs, owner of the newly formed Pheasant Aircraft Company in Memphis, Missouri. Eleven units were built before the death of the company founder in a flying accident on December 5, 1927. Race pilot Steve Wittman took over as test pilot. Wittman helped relocate the company to his home in Fond du Lac, Wisconsin when Adolf Bechaud and his associates purchased the company.

Design
The Pheasant H-10 is made from a welded steel tube fuselage with a fabric covering. The aircraft was powered by a  water cooled Curtiss OX-5 engine. The landing gear was conventionally mounted, with a tail skid.

Operational history
Pheasant test pilot Steve Wittman entered The H-10 was entered into the September 8, 1928 Air Derby from New York to Los Angeles. Dropping out due to radiator trouble in the desert. Wittman finished 12th out of 38 entries. Wittman raced again in the 1928 Air Derby from Los Angeles to Cincinnati and finished in 4th place. He also entered the H-10 in the 1929 National Air Races in Cleveland.

Survivors
 One example is on static display in Memphis, Missouri. Previously located on Long Island, New York, residents of the Memphis area donated over &75,000 in 2012 to purchase and transport the H-10 back to the city of its manufacture.
 The EAA AirVenture Museum has a H-10 on display that was donated in 1971.

Specifications Pheasant H-10

Notes

References

1920s United States sport aircraft
Single-engined tractor aircraft
Biplanes
Aircraft first flown in 1928